Michael Zander, KC, FBA, (born 16 November 1932 in Berlin) is a British legal scholar. He is Professor Emeritus of Law at the London School of Economics and Political Science, and the author of several books known to generations of lawyers and law students alike. Professor Zander was a member of the Royal Commission on Criminal Justice (1991–1993). He is currently a member of the Home Office's PACE Strategy Board.

Biography 
He is the son of lawyer and scholar Walter Zander and 
Margarete (Gretl) Magnus. In 1937, when he was four years old, the family emigrated from Germany to England because of their Jewish background. His brother is the conductor Benjamin Zander.

After attending the Royal Grammar School, High Wycombe from 1946 to 1951, he won an Open Exhibition in English at Jesus College, Cambridge, where he took a Double First Honours Degree in Law, then obtained a First Class in the LLB and was awarded the Whewell Scholarship in International Law. Zander then took an LLM at Harvard University. For a time, he worked with the law firm of Sullivan & Cromwell on Wall Street. After his return to the United Kingdom he qualified with Ashurst Morris Crisp and then briefly practised as a solicitor. During his clerkship he was legal adviser to Tony Benn in his battle to remain in the House of Commons. 

Zander joined the LSE Law Department in 1963 where he was appointed to a Chair in 1977; he was Convenor of the Law Department from 1984 to 1988 and again in 1997–98. He was appointed an Honorary Queen's Counsel in 1997 and was elected a Senior Fellow of the British Academy in 2005. Professor Zander retired from the LSE in 1998.

For twenty-five years, from 1963 to 1988, he was Legal Correspondent of The Guardian newspaper, for which he wrote some 1,400 articles. He has frequently broadcast on radio and television, commenting on legal issues. 

In 2010, Zander was awarded the Honorary Degree of Doctor of Laws by King's College, London. The citation stated: "He has devoted a long and active career to the study, teaching, practice and improvement of the law, and has made outstanding contributions in both the academic and public spheres. There is no greater authority in the fields to which he has devoted himself: criminal procedure, civil procedure, legal system, legal profession and legal services. ... The central mission of his professional life has been to make the justice system work better."

In 2015, he received the Halsbury Lifetime Contribution Award. (These awards were established in 2013. In that year it went to Sir Sydney Kentridge KCMG, QC. In 2014 it went to Lord Judge, Lord Chief Justice 2008–13.)

Selected publications
Lawyers and the Public Interest (1968)
Legal Services for the Community (1978)
A Matter of Justice (1989)
The Crown Court Study (1993)
A Bill of Rights? (4th ed.1997)
The State of Justice (2000)
The Law-Making Process (7th ed., 2015)
The Police and Criminal Evidence Act 1984 (7th ed.2015)
Cases and Materials on the English Legal System (10th ed., 2007)

References

Academics of the London School of Economics
20th-century King's Counsel
21st-century King's Counsel
Honorary King's Counsel
Fellows of the British Academy
People educated at the Royal Grammar School, High Wycombe
Alumni of Jesus College, Cambridge
English people of German-Jewish descent
German emigrants to England
1932 births
Living people
Harvard Law School alumni
Honorary Fellows of the London School of Economics 
20th-century English lawyers 
21st-century English lawyers
Naturalised citizens of the United Kingdom
Jewish emigrants from Nazi Germany to the United Kingdom
Sullivan & Cromwell people